Eagle King is a 1971 Hong Kong wuxia film directed by Chang Cheh and produced by the Shaw Brothers Studio.

Plot
Jin Fei, played by Ti Lung, known as the King Eagle, stumbles into conflict within the Tien Yi Tong clan when he falls in love with the clan's 7th chief, Yuk Lin, played by Li Ching.

Cast
Ti Lung as King Eagle Jin Fei
Lee Ching as 7th Chief An Yuk Lin / 8th Chief An Bing E
Cheung Pooi-saan as 1st Chief Hung Sing Tien
Cheng Miu as Deadly Fingers Wan Hau Ba
Wang Kuang-yu as Fang Shing
Wong Chung as 2nd Chief Fan
Cheng Lui as Chief Koon
Lau Gong as Tien Yi Tong chief
Chan Sing as 5th Chief Chen Tang
Yau Lung as 6th Chief Chu Hung
Lee Sau-kei as Head of Tien Yi Tong
Bruce Tong as Fu Er
Tung Li as Ting, Lo Brothers
Hung Lau as One of Lo Brothers thrown in fire
Tong Gai as Older Tai Shan brother
Chan Chuen as Younger Tai Shan brother
Yuen Woo-ping as Lo Brothers' thug
Lo Wai as Lo Brothers' thug
Hsu Hsia as Lo Brothers' thug
Fung Hak-on as Lo Brothers' thug
Fung Hap-so as Lo Brothers' thug
Tung Choi-bo as Lo Brothers' thug
Sek Siu-kin as Lo Brothers' thug
Yeung Wai as Lo Brothers' thug
Tang Tak-cheung as Lo Brothers' thug
Wong Mei as Lo Brothers' thug
Chan Siu-gai as Lo Brothers' thug / Tai Shan Brothers' thug
Ng Yuen-fan as Lo Brothers' thug / Tien Yi Tong member
Chan Lau as Lo Brothers' thug / Tien Yi Tong member
Tam Bo as Tien Yi Tong member / Tai Shan Brothers' thug
Ko Hung as Tien Yi Tong member
Yuen Shun-yi as Tien Yi Tong member
Wong Shu-tong as Tien Yi Tong member
David Chiang as Tien Yi Tong member
Wong Pau-gei as Tien Yi Tong member
Ho Pak-kwong as Tien Yi Tong member
Cliff Lok as Tien Yi Tong member
Leung Seung-wan as Tien Yi Tong member
San Kuai as Tien Yi Tong member
Wan Leng-gwong as Tien Yi Tong member
Lee Chiu as Tien Yi Tong member
Chik Ngai-hung as Tien Yi Tong member
Danny Chow as Tien Yi Tong member
Huang Ha as Tien Yi Tong member
Brandy Yuen as Tien Yi Tong member
Ho Bo-sing as Tien Yi Tong member
Yuen Shing-chau as Tien Yi Tong member
Cheung Chi-ping as Tien Yi Tong member
Lee Siu-wa as Tien Yi Tong member
Lai Yan as Tien Yi Tong member
Yen Shi-kwan
Lau Jun-fai
Tsang Choh-lam as waiter
Nam Wai-lit as salt cart owner
Wong Ching as salt cart worker
Chin Chun as villager
Hao Li-jen as villager
Chu Gam as villager
Yee Kwan as villager
Gam Tin-chue as villager
Cheung Sek-au as villager
Fuk Yan-cheng as coffin shop boss

External links

1971 films
Hong Kong martial arts films
Wuxia films
Films directed by Chang Cheh
1970s Hong Kong films